George Messo (born April 10, 1969) is an expatriate English poet and translator who was born in rural Lincolnshire, near the town of Barton-Upon-Humber. He moved to Trabzon, Turkey, in 1998 and has since lived in Oman and Saudi Arabia. He was the editor of Near East Review from 2001 to 2007. Messo is a Fellow of the Royal Asiatic Society.

Poetry
Messo's poetry collections are From the Pine Observatory (2000), Entrances (2006), Hearing Still (2009) and Violades & Appledown (2012). He appeared in the 2006 Stride anthology, The Allotment: New Lyric Poets, edited by Andy Brown.

The Economist has associated Messo with the so-called Istanbul School, which includes the English poet and travel writer John Ash.

Translation
Messo is a prominent translator of Turkish poetry. He was shortlisted for the Popescu Prize for European poetry translation in 2007 for his versions of İlhan Berk, A Leaf about to Fall: Selected Poems (2006) and again in 2011 for İkinci Yeni: The Turkish Avant-Garde (2009). Other books include both İlhan Berk's Madrigals (2008) and poetic trilogy, The Book of Things (2009), two major anthologies İkinci Yeni: The Turkish Avant-Garde (2009) and From This Bridge: Contemporary Turkish Women Poets (2010), as well as Gonca Özmen's The Sea Within (2011) and Birhan Keskin's & Silk & Love & Flame (2013). Messo is the editor of the Turkish Modern Poets Series for Red Hand Books, and the editor of the bi-lingual journal Turkish Poetry Today.

References

External links
 Doing the Translocal: on George Messo's Entrances by Alistair Noon
Author profile  at Shearsman Books

1969 births
Living people
English-language poets
People from Barton-upon-Humber
Turkish–English translators
English male poets